Ricardo Pérez may refer to:
 Ricardo Pérez (Colombian footballer) (born 1973)
 Ricardo Pérez (Mexican footballer) (born 1995)
 Ricardo Pérez (boxer) (born 1991), Mexican boxer
 Ricardo Perez (darts player) (born 1988), Spanish darts player
 Ricardo Pérez Godoy (1905–1982), general of the Peruvian army and president of Peru
 Ricardo Pérez Manrique (born 1947), Uruguayan lawyer and judge